Antheua is a genus of moths of the family Notodontidae erected by Francis Walker in 1855.

Species

References

Notodontidae